Eikeli is a district in the municipality of Bærum, Norway. Its population (2007) is 6,940.

It is served by the rail station Østerås on the Røa Line.

References

Villages in Akershus
Neighbourhoods in Bærum